Caroline Gustafva Eleonora von Knorring  (6 October 1841 – 4 August 1925) was a Swedish photographer and one of the first professional woman photographers in Sweden.

Life and career
Caroline was born in Gothenburg, Sweden at the von Knorring noble family. When her father failed in business, she was encouraged to take up photography as a profession. She moved from Gothenburg to Stockholm and opened a photo studio at Jakobsbergsgatan, which she ran between 1864 and 1871. Of Stockholm's one hundred registered photographers in the 1860s, there were only 15 women at that time. She has participated at the Industrial Exhibition in Stockholm in 1866.
In 1872, she married Ehrenfried Roth, a wealthy politician. After marriage, she closed her studio in Stockholm and moved to a mansion in Sunnansjö. At Sunnansjö, she photographed landscapes for pleasure. She lived there until the death of her husband in 1905. Following her husband's death, she moved to Ludvika mansion, and used the Sunnansjö mansion as her summer residence. Caroline von Knorring died in 1925 and her remains rest in Roths' family grave at Ludvika Ulrica church's cemetery.

Notable photographs by Caroline

References
 Ekomuseum Bergslagen
Kultur

Further reading
 

Swedish women photographers
1841 births
1925 deaths
People from Gothenburg
20th-century Swedish photographers
20th-century women photographers
20th-century Swedish women
19th-century Swedish photographers
19th-century Swedish women
19th-century women photographers